Paderne is a municipality of northwestern Spain in the province of A Coruña, in the autonomous community of Galicia. It belongs to the comarca of Betanzos. It has a population of 2,735 (2006) and an area of 38.3 km². It is 26 km from the provincial capital, A Coruña.

The town is on the English Way path of the Camino de Santiago.

References

Municipalities in the Province of A Coruña